Abdulhalim Humoud Mohamed (born 4 March 1994) is a Tanzanian football midfielder who plays for Namungo.

References

1987 births
Living people
Tanzanian footballers
Tanzania international footballers
Mtibwa Sugar F.C. players
Simba S.C. players
Azam F.C. players
Sofapaka F.C. players
Coastal Union F.C. players
Real Kings F.C. players
Maji Maji F.C. players
Association football midfielders
Zanzibar international footballers
Tanzanian expatriate footballers
Expatriate footballers in Kenya
Tanzanian expatriate sportspeople in Kenya
Tanzanian Premier League players